Voice break generally refers to transitions between different vocal registers of the human voice. Although singing is mostly done using the modal register, it is important for more professional singers to be able to smoothly move between different vocal registers.

Professional singers refer to this break as the Passaggio. 

Unintentional voice breaks are called a voice crack.

Voice break may also refer to the deepening of the male voice during puberty, known as the voice change.

See also
Voice change
Puberty

Human voice